Richard Hibbard (born 13 December 1983) is a Wales international rugby player currently playing for the Dragons.

Hibbard was born in Neath, Wales. He’s married with 3 children.  A hooker, he started playing rugby at age grade levels at clubs in the town of Port Talbot, including Aberavon Quins RFC and Taibach RFC. A former pupil of Glan Afan Comprehensive School, he went on to play at senior level for Taibach, Aberavon RFC and Swansea before making his name at the Ospreys.

He used to play rugby league for Aberavon Fighting Irish and made one appearance for Wales A in their 28–18 win over England A in Aberavon in 2003.

Hibbard attained his first Wales cap against Argentina in June 2006. Hibbard missed the 2011 Rugby World Cup through injury.

He was named as part of the Lions squad for the 2013 British & Irish Lions tour to Australia. Winning caps in all three test matches and starting the third and decisive match.

On 16 December 2013, it was announced that Hibbard would join Gloucester Rugby in the English Aviva Premiership on a three-year contract from the 2014–15 season.

On 18 December 2017 it was confirmed Hibbard would return to Wales to sign for regional side Dragons on a three-year contract in the Pro14 from the 2018–19 season.

In recent times (2021), Richard Hibbard expanded even further than his rugby career, whereby he  opened two successful restaurants including The Hideout Cafe at Aberavon Shopping Centre & The Front at Aberavon Beach, Port Talbot.

International tries

References

External links
Gloucester profile
Ospreys profile
Wales profile
ESPN Profile

1983 births
Living people
Aberavon RFC players
British & Irish Lions rugby union players from Wales
Dragons RFC players
Gloucester Rugby players
Neath Port Talbot Steelers players
Ospreys (rugby union) players
People educated at Glan Afan Comprehensive School
Rugby union hookers
Rugby union players from Neath
Swansea RFC players
Taibach RFC players
Wales international rugby union players
Welsh rugby league players
Welsh rugby union players